Defending champion Jiske Griffioen defeated Yui Kamiji in the final, 6–4, 6–4 to win the women's wheelchair tennis title at the 2016 Wheelchair Tennis Masters.

Seeds

  Jiske Griffioen (champion)
  Aniek van Koot (round robin)
  Yui Kamiji (final)
  Marjolein Buis (semifinals, fourth place)
  Jordanne Whiley (round robin, withdrew)
  Sabine Ellerbrock (round robin, withdrew)
  Diede de Groot (semifinals, third place)
  Lucy Shuker (round robin)

Draw

Finals

Group A

Group B

References

External links

Women's singles draw

Masters, 2016